Glenell Sanders (born November 4, 1966) is a former American football linebacker. He played for the Chicago Bears in 1990, the Los Angeles Rams in 1991, the Denver Broncos in 1994 and for the Indianapolis Colts in 1995.

References

1966 births
Living people
American football linebackers
Louisiana Tech Bulldogs football players
Chicago Bears players
Los Angeles Rams players
Denver Broncos players
Indianapolis Colts players